The Barrington Woolen Mill Museum, located in Barrington, Nova Scotia, is a part of the Nova Scotia Museum.
The museum is a preserved 19th century turbine mill. It was built in 1882, and ceased wool production in 1962. It became part of the Nova Scotia Museum system in 1967, as an example of one of the last small mills of the 1800s. The mill is listed on the Canadian Register of Historic Places (CRHP).

See also
List of museums in Nova Scotia

References

External links
Barrington Woolen Mill
Canada's Historic Places: The Barrington Woolen Mill

History museums in Nova Scotia
Nova Scotia Museum